Puya claudiae is a species of plant in the genus Puya. This species is endemic to Bolivia.

References

claudiae
Flora of Bolivia